Lovön is an island in the Swedish Lake Mälaren in Ekerö Municipality of Stockholm County. It was a municipality of its own until 1952, when it was joined with Ekerö Municipality. Lovön's greatest attraction is Drottningholm Palace and its many public gardens, which were built on the island in 1580.

History

There is much known about the history of this rather small island. Owing to its status today as a World Heritage Site, much research has gone into its history. It is estimated that Lovön has been inhabited since around the 25th century BC.

Stone Age

Traces of Stone Age hunting and fishing camps dated as old as 2500 B.C. have been found by archaeologists on Lovön. Harpoons made of bone, stone tools, ceramic bowls, and remains of huts are some artifacts that have been located and researched. It is also believed that these camps were seasonal quarters rather than year-round habitations. The island was at this point a set of broken-up smaller islands, since the water level in Lake Mälaren was significantly higher than it is today.

Nordic Bronze Age

During the Nordic Bronze Age permanent settlement began. As the water level dropped off, more land was exposed, and the smaller islands were shaped into a coherent landmass. New wetlands were created in the low-lying areas, moist and fertile. Archaeological studies show a large amount of juniper and grass pollen — a sign that much of Lovön was open land for cattle-grazing. Archaeologists have found smaller living quarters around the spot where the church is located today. 30 or so stone burial mounds have been found scattered throughout the island from this period. From the bone materials found in these burial mounds it has established that only men were put in burial mounds, and only one person per generation received this type of burial, suggesting that the buried men were chieftains. Towards the end of the Bronze Age, pollen counts indicate abundant spruce trees growing in the open fields.

Iron Age

During the Iron Age the waters of Mälaren receded again and new land masses were created, causing an increase in the population. Farming families, tilling the fertile lower lands, became the norm. Each family would typically have their own set of fields and a family graveyard, placed on infertile lands. Consequently, many of the graves have been untouched until modern times.

The pre-Christian tradition of burial was cremation on a funeral pyre. The remains were gathered and covered with selected stones, and then packed with dirt. Towards the very end of the Iron Age Christianity gradually made its way into this region of Sweden, where the pagan ways were, however, slow to die. Burials of converted pagans did not involve burning the body, but rather dressing it in a simple white dress and burial in the ground. The grave site was rectangular, usually oriented east–west, and, at times, lined with stones.

Late Middle Ages onwards

By the late Middle Ages, the family farms had combined into villages. Commonly between two and four farms would combine into a village. Names such as Norrby (North Village), Söderby (South Village) Rinkeby, Edeby, and so on, many of which are still current, derive from this period. During this period, part of the island was taken as royal property; the son of Gustav Vasa, Johan III, erected a stone house on the island in 1579. This house would become Drottningholm Palace.

Contemporary

Lovön has about 1,000 permanent inhabitants. The major employer is the Swedish National Defence Radio Establishment, which has been located there since 1942. A large part of the island was designated as a UNESCO World Heritage Site in 1991 for the Drottningholm Palace and surrounding gardens. The island's sights are a major tourist destination, especially during the summer.

The Church

The oldest section of Lovö Church, the island's church (not to be confused with the castle church of Drottningholm Palace), has been dated back to the later part of the 12th century. One researcher, Berit Wallenberg, claims it was built as early as the 11th century. It is also believed that an even older wooden church existed on this site. Church sermons are held in the church, normally once a month, and for certain Christian holidays.

Interior
The sanctuary of the church was created around 1670. The architect is believed to be Nicodemus Tessin the Elder, who was working on Drottningholm Palace around this same time. Inside the church are 30 gravestones, several of which belonged to people employed at Drottningholm palace. The interior was renovated in 2004.

Exterior

The church is unusually small and narrow. It was extended to the east, first in the 13th and further in the 17th century. Churches built during this time were built with a weapons room, a foyer where people going to church had to lay down their arms before entering the church itself. This weapons house was demolished in 1798, and an entry was made in the west side of the attached church tower.

Lovö Runestones
Five runestones known as the Lovö Runestones are currently located around the church. The stones date from the early 11th century, and contain some names of the local people, such as Torgils, Signiut, Holmer, Vig, Tingfast, and Johan.

References

Sources
Ekerö municipality, official church organisation website (In Swedish)
Lovön local interest organisation (In Swedish)

Islands of Mälaren
Drottningholm Palace